The Kilikiti World Cup is an international kilikiti tournament held in New Zealand.

The inaugural World Cup was held in 2001.

Teams

By year

2001
The first Kilikiti World Cup was held at Waitakere Athletic Sports Stadium, Henderson, Auckland, New Zealand in January 2001. Seven teams took part, representing American Samoa, Australia, the Cook Islands, New Zealand, Niue, Tokelau and the United States. The final, played over a series of three games, was won by the New Zealand K-Blacks, who beat the American Samoa Chiefs two games to one.

2002
The 2002 Kilikiti World Cup took place at Parrs Park, Glen Eden, Auckland, New Zealand.

2015
The 2015 Kilikiti World Cup took place at Frank Kitts Park, Wellington, New Zealand.

References